The Royal Commission on the Moving Picture Industry in Australia was held from 1926–1928. It explored a series of issues to do with the Australian film industry, with evidence given by a number of leading figures at the time including Franklyn Barrett, Gayne Dexter, Paulette McDonagh, Stuart F. Doyle, William Gibson, Raymond Longford and Louise Lovely. It made a number of recommendations but its ultimate impact was limited.

References

Additional resources
 Royal Commission on the Moving Picture Industry In Australia Research Papers - Academia.edu
 Australian (Inter)national Cinema: The Royal Commission on the Moving Picture Industry in Australia, 1926–1928., Australasian Films Ltd. and the American monopoly
 Royal Commission into the Moving Picture Industry (Media Classification)

External links

Complete Report of the Royal Commission
The Royal Commission on the Moving Picture Industry in Australia at the National Film and Sound Archive

Cinema of Australia
Moving picture
History of film